Bolshoy Log is a rural locality (a settlement) in Zakovryashinsky Selsoviet, Krutikhinsky District, Altai Krai, Russia. The population was 93 as of 2013. There is 1 street.

Geography 
Bolshoy Log is located 16 km southwest of Krutikha (the district's administrative centre) by road. Zakovryashino is the nearest rural locality.

References 

Rural localities in Krutikhinsky District